Sonu Satheesh Kumar  better known by her screen name Sonu, is an Indian actress and classical dancer acting mainly in Malayalam  and Tamil television serials. The TV show Vaalkkannadi rose her to fame and popularity. She is known for her roles in Sthreedhanam and Anbe Vaa.

She is a well trained Bharatanatyam and Kuchipudi dancer who has performed in several dance shows including Nishagandhi festival 2017. She hold Master's in Kuchipudi and diploma in Bharatanatyam and also conducts several dance workshops.

Biography
She is trained under Geetha Padmakumar, Parvathy Sasidharan and Job Thrissur in Bharatanatyam, Kuchipudi and Folk. She holds MA in Kuchipudi, Diploma in Bharatanatyam and currently pursuing doctoral degree in Kuchipudi. She has cleared UGC NET exam and is currently teaching in Sai Shivam School of Dance. She married IT engineer Ajay in 2017 at Guruvayur.

Starting her career as a television host she made her debut through popular Malayalam serial Sreeguruvayurappan and made her debut as a lead in Tamil serial Anbe Vaa. Her performance as the wicked vamp in the popular serial Sthreedhanam on Asianet made her a known figure on Malayalam TV. She also participated in a reality show Sundari Neeyum Sundaran Njaanum  along with Rajesh Hebbar on Asianet.She has done a cameo appearance in 2 Harihar Nagar. She then appeared in a short film ; God Bless Nithya.

Filmography
 Television career

References

Actresses in Malayalam television
Actresses in Tamil television
Actresses in Malayalam cinema
Year of birth missing (living people)
Living people
21st-century Indian actresses